The BMW PGA Championship is an annual men's professional golf tournament on the European Tour. It was founded in 1955 by the Professional Golfers' Association, and originally called the British PGA Championship.

History
The BMW PGA Championship has usually been played each May, on the weekend of the UK's Spring Bank Holiday, over the West Course at the Wentworth Club in Surrey, England. The PGA European Tour has its headquarters at the club and as the tour's home tournament, the BMW PGA Championship is often regarded as the flagship event on the European Tour. The tournament switched to September in 2019 as part of a revamp of the golfing calendar in which the US PGA Championship moved to May.

It has usually had the highest prize money of any event which the tour organises, but this changed in 2009 with the introduction of the Race to Dubai, and the $10 million Dubai World Championship at the end of the season. There are other more lucrative events than the BMW PGA Championship which are part of the European Tour schedule, such as the majors and the World Golf Championship events, but these are organised by other bodies. It is also the European Tour's designated "Premier event" for the purposes of the Official World Golf Rankings, with a minimum of 64 ranking points available to the winner.

The winner of the tournament is given an exemption into that season's U.S. Open and the next three Open Championships.

In 2000, Colin Montgomerie became the only player to win three years in a row.

In 2021, Billy Horschel became only the second American to win the event, the first since Arnold Palmer in 1975.

Winners

Multiple winners
Only nine men have won the event more than once up to and including 2019.
4 wins:
Nick Faldo – 1978, 1980, 1981, 1989
3 wins:
Peter Alliss – 1957, 1962, 1965
Bernhard Langer – 1987, 1993, 1995
Colin Montgomerie – 1998, 1999, 2000
2 wins:
Tony Jacklin – 1972, 1982
Seve Ballesteros – 1983, 1991
Ian Woosnam – 1988, 1997
Anders Hansen – 2002, 2007
Luke Donald – 2011, 2012

Media coverage
Currently in the United Kingdom, all four rounds of the BMW PGA Championship are shown live by Sky Sports with highlights being shown by the BBC.

Notes

References

External links
Coverage on European Tour official site
BMW Golfsport – official BMW golf site

 
European Tour events
Golf tournaments in England
Sport in Surrey
BMW
Recurring sporting events established in 1955
1955 establishments in England